Stadlober is a surname. Notable people with the surname include:

Alois Stadlober (born 1962), Austrian cross-country skier
Luis Stadlober (born 1991), Austrian cross-country skier
Robert Stadlober (born 1982), Austrian actor and musician
Teresa Stadlober (born 1993), Austrian cross-country skier